The Battle of Escape Creek was a naval engagement fought between the United Kingdom's Royal Navy and the Qing Chinese naval force on 25–27 May 1857 during the Second Opium War. Commodore Charles Elliot's squadron chased the war-junks at Escape Creek (present-day East River) and then, once the British ships were grounded as the river narrowed, they chased them in the ships' boats until all the junks had been overhauled.

Gallery

References

Bibliography
Behan, T. L., ed. (1859). Bulletins and Other State Intelligence for the Year 1857. Part 2. London: Harrison and Sons.

Further reading
Cooke, George Wingrove (1861). China and Lower Bengal (5th ed.). London: Routledge, Warne, & Routledge. pp. 15–18.

1857 in China
Escape Creek
Escape Creek
Escape Creek
Escape Creek
Escape Creek
Escape Creek
Escape Creek
May 1857 events